"Factory model schools", "factory model education", or "industrial era schools" are ahistorical terms that emerged in the mid to late-20th century and are used by writers and speakers as a rhetorical device by those advocating a change to the American public education system. Generally speaking, when used, the terms are referencing characteristics of European education that emerged in the late 18th century and then in North America in the mid-19th century that include top-down management, outcomes designed to meet societal needs, age-based classrooms, the modern liberal arts curriculum, and a focus on producing results. The phrase is typically used in the context of discussing what the author has identified as negative aspects of public (or government-funded) schools. As an example, the "factory model of schools are 'designed to create docile subjects and factory workers'". The phrases are also used to incorrectly suggest the look of American education hasn't changed since the 19th century. Educational historians describe the phrase as misleading and an inaccurate representation of the development of American public education.

History of the terms
The first public use of the term "factory model schools" to describe K-12 education was by Dr. Howard Lamb in a speech in September, 1972. The Greenville News reported: "The educational institutions are producing teachers for the 1920 factory model schools, Lamb said." Previously, Theresa Jablonski, in a 1970, editorial in the News Herald (Franklin, Pennsylvania), referenced "factory model of education" to describe college classrooms. Although it's likely that neither Jablonski or Lamb originated the term, their usage represents the terms' first appearance in the media.

The phrase has been used by education leaders, including Marilyn Roth of the National Education Association in 1987. In a 1989 piece in The Phi Delta Kappa, "The Horse is Dead", Dr Leslie A. Howard connected the term to Horace Mann's experiences in Prussia in 1843 but offered no references or evidence for the connection. Howard's piece was cited in numerous educational philosophy and theory texts in the 1980s and 1990s. Al Shanker, the president of the American Federation of Teachers, referenced the concept in a 1989 speech, "The Revolution that is Overdue: From Information Factory to Learning and Teaching in Restructuring Schools." Ted Dintersmith, author of What School Could Be: Insights and Inspiration from Teachers across America (2018), used the term in a graphic to describe the evolution of the American education system. In the graphic, "factory model" is connected to the year 1893 (the year the NEA Committee of Ten published their final report) and the goal of training "factory workers." The Committee of Ten report makes no mention of factories or factory workers. Authors will also draw connections between child-labor laws, factories, and the spread of tax-funded schools and compulsory education laws such as Seth Godin in his 2004 book Stop Stealing Dreams.

In the latter half of the 20th century in America there were three distinct types of public school systems.  In the mill towns and the big cities there was the "factory School" designed to teach obedience and regimentation and prepare children for life in the factory or in the military. In the small towns and inner suburbs the school systems were designed to sort and classify the kids and prepare some for college.  In the wealthy suburbs and the private schools education was geared toward personal development and creativity.

John Taylor Gatto's 2001 book The Underground History of American Education linked the "factory school" model to a number of cultural ills and also connected Mann to Prussian factories. Gatto's text has been cited by multiple non-fiction books on education, including The End of Average by Todd Rose (2015) and Schools on Trial by Nikhil Goyal (2016), both of which use the phrase to advocate a particular set of changes. Gatto does not explain how he reached the conclusion Mann wanted schools that worked like, or looked like, factories.

As a metaphor
In some cases, authors have used the term "factory model" as a metaphor. As a modern example, the animation and text of Sir Ken Robinson's TED Talk compares students in schools to materials in a factory and references children's "date of manufacturing" as a sorting mechanism. This clearest example of this in historical writing is in the research of Raymond E. Callahan, especially in Education and the Cult of Efficiency (1962).  Callahan explored the relationship between public education and the emerging concept of Scientific Management in the 1910s and included quotes by school leaders who spoke of children as the "raw goods" schools were meant to mold into something better. The most prolific user of this analogy was Ellwood Patterson Cubberley. He saw the logical, methodical approach of scientific management as a way for public education to adapt to influxes of children entering the system and to ensure the best outcomes. Cubberley wrote numerous guides for school administrators as well as a history book and was one of the most widely read educational authors of the 1910s and 1920s. He frequently used the metaphor of school as a factory:Our schools are, in a sense, factories, in which the raw products (children) are to be shaped and fashioned into products to meet the various demands of life. The specifications for manufacturing come from the demands of twentieth-century civilization, and it is the business of the school to build its pupils according to the specifications laid down.

A theory that informed school leaders during this period was the work of Frederick Taylor. His approach to time management was known as Taylorism and it influenced multiple aspects of American society, including education. An example of its adoption in the home are the experiences of Lillian and Frank Gilbreth, whose scientific approach to parenting was described in their son's book Cheaper By the Dozen. In schools, this philosophical approach - that any problem could be solved by breaking it down into smaller units and considering time costs - was used in a variety of ways. For example, a group of English teachers in 1913 aggregated how much time they spent grading papers and used their findings to appeal to school leaders for more time to grade and provide feedback. 

While teachers would use Taylorism to their advantage and to plead their case, they also spoke up against it and its impact on their work. In 1903, Margaret Haley chided school administrators for failing to recognize teachers' hard work and a tendency toward "factory-izing education" and "making the teacher an automaton, a mere factory hand, whose duty it is to carry out mechanically and unquestioningly the ideas and orders of those clothed with the authority of position." Haley used quotations around the phrase "factory-izing education" in her speech, suggesting she saw it as a metaphor, and not a direct comparison. Additionally, some educational historians in the modern era question the popularity of Taylorism in schools and suggest it may not be as widespread as is led to be believed. Likewise, the framework of "social engineering" and "scientific management" needs to be better situated within critical race theory and studies of gender, race, and disability. 

Although the phrase "factory model" didn't become a part of educational discourse until the 1980s, David B. Tyack, a leader in the field of educational history, provided a context for it in his history of American urban education, The One Best System (1974). "Just as eighteenth-century theologians could think of God as a clock-maker without derogation, so the social engineers searching for new organizational forms used the words 'machine' and 'factory' without investing them with the negative associations they evoke today." Larry Cuban, another education historian, connects the metaphor to a particular mindset around the purpose of education. In Pillars of the Republic, Common Schools and American Society, 1780-1860, Carl Kaestle (1983) offers:Schools thus became in some respects like factories, but not necessarily because they were mimicking factories, or preparing children to work in factories. Rather, both the workplace and the schools, as well as other nineteenth-century institutions, were partaking of the same ethos of efficiency, manipulation, and mastery. (p. 69)

Critiques of the terms
Setting aside that school leaders around the turn of 20th century used factories as a metaphor and not a philosophical foundation, there are at least two problems with the terms.

Users of the phrase generally point to two documents as evidence for their use of the claim: Horace Mann's reports in the 1840s and the 1892 Committee of Ten Report. Mann presented his thoughts following his trip to Prussia in a report to the Massachusetts Board of Education. He filed several reports and his 7th annual report, published in January 1844, focused on his experiences in Europe, including Prussia. In the Seventh Annual Report of the Secretary of the Board, Mann - the Secretary of the Board of Education at the time - does not mention Prussian factories. In fact, he denounced the Prussian education system's ability to foster blind obedience to authority in this report, stating;

While this alone is not sufficient enough to refute claims that a factory model mentality currently exists and has previously informed the development of American schools, it does challenge claims made by authors like Taylor Gatto that Mann was eager to replicate a model of education that would train children to work in factories. Likewise, the final report by the National Education Association's Committee of Ten makes no reference to factory skills or to modeling schools after factories, a claim that is often found in books that advocate a dramatic change to American public education (e.g., Most Likely to Succeed (2015), by Tony Wagner and Ted Dintersmith).

Factories that existed around the time of Mann and the spread of the common school movement don't resemble factories in the way we think of them today. The most in-depth look at the discrepancy between the phrase and the actual look of schools and factories in the 1840s is The Invented History of 'The Factory Model of Education''' by Audrey Watters. Even though historians have taken different perspectives on the influence of merchants and manufacturers on the rise of the Common School movement, there is a consensus that the focus of education for most of American history, especially at the primary levels, has been about general knowledge and citizenship, not the specific skills required for factory work.

Facilities

"Factory model classrooms" is also a term used by architects to describe a particular approach to design. Unlike the single-room schoolhouse in which all students of all ages are in the same space, "factory model classrooms" tend to be of a similar size and configuration, 800-900 square feet, with approximately 28-35 students of about the same age.  As single-room schools became larger, this model was replicated, with the classrooms created as a series of boxes, often along a long double-loaded corridor (with classrooms on each side).  This approach to school design is also described as "cells and bells" by architects and at the high school level is frequently used in conjunction with departmental model schools.

Efficiency in design was a key determinant of school design as early as the 1920s, with John Joseph Donovan's 1921 seminal School Architecture: Principles and Practices'', calling for schools to be "tested in the abstract for efficiency and adequacy."  One example of this type of efficient design is the Bauhaus in Dessau, Germany.This "cells and bells" model became a common approach to design but was not universal. The Crow Island School, which opened in 1940 in Illinois, was designed to support a progressive education and personalized model while also using aesthetics and forms that would soon become part of the modern or International Style. Some school architects would copy the look of Crow Island, but not the philosophical approach.

The primary design impetus of many American schools following an increase in enrollment due to the arrival of Baby Boomers in school was to renovate unsafe or overcrowded facilities, remove inadequate temporary classrooms, commonly referred to as "portables," and accommodate as many children as possible. In some places, schools experimented with innovative approaches to school design, but the "cells and bells" model is the most common.

References

Educational facilities
Pedagogy
School types